In mathematics, the Simon problems (or Simon's problems) are a series of fifteen questions posed in the year 2000 by Barry Simon, an American mathematical physicist. Inspired by other collections of mathematical problems and open conjectures, such as the famous list by David Hilbert, the Simon problems concern quantum operators. Eight of the problems pertain to anomalous spectral behavior of Schrödinger operators, and five concern operators that incorporate the Coulomb potential. 

In 2014, Artur Avila won a Fields Medal for work including the solution of three Simon problems. Among these was the problem of proving that the set of energy levels of one particular abstract quantum system was in fact the Cantor set, a challenge known as the "Ten Martini Problem" after the reward that Mark Kac offered for solving it. 

The 2000 list was a refinement of a similar set of problems that Simon had posed in 1984.

Context 

Here  is the coordinate of the  -th particle,  is the Laplacian with respect to the coordinate . Even if the Hamiltonian does not explictly depend on the state of the spin sector, the presence of spin has an effect due to the antisymmetry condition on the total wavefunction.
 We define , that is, the ground state energy of the  system.

The 1984 list 
Simon listed the following problems in 1984:

In 2000, Simon claimed that five of the problems he listed had been solved.

The 2000 list 
The Simon problems as listed in 2000 (with original categorizations) are:

See also
Almost Mathieu operator
Lieb–Thirring inequality

External links

References

unsolved problems in mathematics
Unsolved problems in physics
Mathematical physics